Trevor Francis (born 1954) is an English former footballer

Trevor Francis may also refer to:

 Trevor Francis, English singer and contestant on The Voice UK
 Trevor Francis, a member of the UK Music Hall of Fame

See also
 Samuel Trevor Francis